Le Pays is a newspaper in Burkina Faso. It was founded in 1991. As of 2013 it has a circulation of 10,000.

References

External links

 Le Pays 

Newspapers published in Burkina Faso
French-language newspapers published in Africa
Publications established in 1991
1991 establishments in Burkina Faso